Șiștarovăț is a commune in Arad County, Romania, is situated on the Lipova Hills and it occupies approximately 12,300 ha. It is composed of four villages: Cuveșdia (Temeskövesd), Labașinț (Lábas), Șiștarovăț (situated at 42 km from Arad) and Varnița (Mészdorgos).

Population
According to the last census the population of the commune counts 383 inhabitants. From an ethnical point of view it has the following structure:  94.5% are Romanians, 1.0% Hungarians, 2.9% Roma and 1.6% are of other or undeclared nationalities.

History
The first documentary records of Șiștarovăț and Cuveșdia date back to 1440, Labașinț was first mentioned in 1477, while Varnița between 1820–1830.

Economy
The economy of the commune is mainly agricultural, pomiculture, viticulture, livestock-breeding and conversion of timber are well represented. The commune has a forest area of more than 6000 ha.

Tourism
Although it is not abundant of spectacles, the landscapes of the Lipova Hills, as well as the traditions and the residents' hospitality are worth experiencing. There is also a cowboy and Indian style ranch which provides summer camps for kids and teens from the Arad county.

References

Communes in Arad County
Localities in Romanian Banat